Jamaica Buses, Inc., also known as Jamaica Bus Lines or the Jamaica Bus Company, was a bus company in New York City, United States, operating local service in Queens and express service to Manhattan until January 30, 2006, when the MTA Bus Company took over its operations.

The president of Jamaica Buses, and GTJ Reit Inc. was the late Jerome Cooper (August 14, 1928 – May 20, 2015, aged 86). Its facility was located on 114-15 Guy R. Brewer Boulevard in South Jamaica, Queens.

From 1954 to 1995, Jamaica Buses, also provided charter services.

History
After the bankruptcy of the Long Island Electric Railway in 1926, the company's trolley lines in Nassau County were disestablished, however the ones in Queens survived, and the company was reorganized as the Jamaica Central Railways. This company would continue to operate streetcars for another six years. Upon reestablishment, the company purchased used trolley cars from companies such as the Empire State Railroad of Oswego, and the New York and Stamford Railway. Many of these cars dated back as far as 1911 and proved to be defective when used on the Far Rockaway Line. The conditions became so dangerous that by the Summer of 1930 the New York State Public Service Commission intervened and demanded that they trade the cars in for those from the Eastern Massachusetts Street Railway. Unfortunately, those cars proved to be inadequate, and that line was eventually abandoned. Cars on other lines inherited from the LIER did not suffer such misfortunes.

In 1930, the City of New York granted the company a bus franchise service named Jamaica Buses, a subsidiary of Jamaica Central Railways. Bus operation over all the former JCR trolley lines began on November 12, 1933; this coincided with the widening of Jamaica Avenue, and the removal of the trolley tracks on the former routes. The company was acquired by the stockholders of Green Bus Lines in April 1949 after financial troubles, but also continued to operate independently. The change in ownership took effect on April 13, 1949, with Green Lines paying $200,000. In 1971 the QM21 express route to Manhattan was initiated.

Bus routes

Just prior to MTA Bus takeover, Jamaica Buses operated on the following routes that are now based in Baisley Park Bus Depot, the former company facility. All four local routes shared a northern terminal in Jamaica, Queens at the Parsons Boulevard subway station at Hillside Avenue. Old route designations can also be found in the local routes.

References

External links

NYCDOT - Privately Operated Bus Service (as of early-to-mid 2000s, accessed January 19, 2007)
Jamaica Bus Photos (Bus:NYCSubway.org)
 Story of the Long Island Electric Railway and the Jamaica Central Railways, 1894-1933, Internet Archive

Transport companies established in 1933
Bus transportation in New York City
Defunct public transport operators in the United States
Transport companies disestablished in 2006
1933 establishments in New York City
2006 disestablishments in New York (state)